(The) Boy(s) Next Door may refer to:

Comics
 Boy's Next Door, a one-volume manga by Kaori Yuki
 Boys Next Door, a comic strip which appeared in the GLBT newspaper Just Out until 2003

Film, television and theater
 Peter Allen: Not the Boy Next Door, a 2015 Australian two part mini-series
 The Boy Next Door (film), a 2015 film by Rob Cohen
 The Boys Next Door (1985 film), a drama/adventure film starring Charlie Sheen
 The Boys Next Door (1996 film), an American television movie starring Nathan Lane in the Hallmark Hall of Fame
 The Boys Next Door (play), a play by Tom Griffin, basis for the 1996 film
 "The Boy Next Door" (Medium), an episode of the TV series Medium

Literature
 The Boy Next Door (novel), a 2002 novel by Meg Cabot
The Boy Next Door, a novel from the Fear Street books series by R. L. Stine.
The Boy Next Door, a  novel by Enid Blyton
The Boy Next Door, a novel by Janet Quin-Harkin

Music

Artists and producers
 The Boy Next Door (DJ), Dutch DJ and record producer
 The Boys Next Door, an Australian band that became the Birthday Party

Works
 "Boy Next Door" (song), a 2000 single from British R&B artist Jamelia 
 Boy Next Door (album), a 2011 studio album by Alfaaz and Yo Yo Honey Singh
 The Boy Next Door (album), a 2003 album by Stacey Kent
 "The Boy Next Door" (song), a 1944 popular song by Hugh Martin and Ralph Blane
 "Not the Boy Next Door", a 1983 song by Peter Allen

See also
 Girl Next Door (disambiguation)